Global Airways is a name used by several airlines including:

Global Airways (BSP) based in the Democratic Republic of Congo
Global Airways (GLB) based in the United States
Global Airways (Turks and Caicos) based in the Turks and Caicos Islands